Frances Tiafoe was the defending champion, but lost in the first round to Dan Evans.

Evans, a qualifier, eventually reached the final but lost to Radu Albot, 6–3, 3–6, 6–7(7–9), double-faulting on championship point after squandering three championship points of his own in the tiebreaker. Albot became the first player from Moldova to win on the ATP Tour.

Seeds

Draw

Finals

Top half

Bottom half

Qualifying

Seeds

Qualifiers

Qualifying draw

First qualifier

Second qualifier

Third qualifier

Fourth qualifier

References

External Links
 Main draw
 Qualifying draw

Delray Beach Open - Singles
2019 Singles
Delray Beach Open – Singles
Delray Beach Open – Singles